Parabalaenoptera is a genus of prehistoric baleen whale found in Marin County, California. The type species is P. baulinensis. It lived during the late Miocene.

References

Prehistoric cetacean genera
Natural history of the San Francisco Bay Area
Fossil taxa described in 1997
Miocene cetaceans